Mamakan (also Romanized as Mamakān) is a village in Margavar Rural District, Silvaneh District, Urmia County, West Azerbaijan Province, Iran. At the 2006 census, its population was 640, in 98 families.

References 

Populated places in Urmia County